Lieutenant General Mohammad Shafiq (born April 1934) is a retired three-star rank army general of the Pakistan Army. He also served as the Governor of Khyber-Pakhtunkhwa from 1999 to 2000. He was appointed to that position on 21 October 1999 by General Pervez Musharraf. He then served as Pakistani Ambassador to Bahrain from 2000 to 2002.

Early life and army career 
Mohammad Shafiq was born in Kohat in April. He was commissioned in the Punjab Regiment in March 1956 in the 13th PMA Long Course. Lt Gen(R) Mohammad Shafiq has been a high profiles career oriented officer while serving in Pakistan Army. He successfully raised XXXI Corps in Bahawalpur and added a defensive potent to Pakistan Army in southern region. Lt Gen (R) Shafiq was instrumental in carrying out Gen.(R) Aslam Mirza's defensive-offensive doctrine. This doctrine was successfully displayed in the Pakistan Army's biggest exercise called Zarb-e-Momin, postured against the Indian Army's Exercise Brasstacks. During his 35-year-long military career, General Shafiq served in some important positions, such as the Inspector-General of the Frontier Corps, a posting which provided him with great exposure to the affairs of the country's western borders as well as tribal affairs.

Post retirement activities 
After retiring from the army, Shafiq served as chairman of the prime minister's inspection team until 1993. During the caretaker government of Moeen Qureshi, General Shafiq remained a federal minister, looking after the affairs of at least six federal ministries. He was appointed the first chief executive of the Northern Areas when Benazir Bhutto came to power in 1993, but he chose to retire before completing his term. Known to be a mild and soft-spoken person, General Shafiq underwent a heart bypass in 1998.

References

External links 
 http://findarticles.com/p/articles/mi_hb092/is_10_30/ai_n28749172/

1934 births
Living people
Pakistani generals
Governors of Khyber Pakhtunkhwa
People from Kohat District
Ambassadors of Pakistan to Bahrain